Historic Kirtland Village, located in Kirtland, Lake County, Ohio, is the name given to a historic site (itself made up of historic buildings and sites important to the early Latter Day Saint movement). The village is owned and operated by the Church of Jesus Christ of Latter-day Saints (LDS Church).

History
The LDS Church purchased the first property in the village, the Newel K. Whitney Store, in the late 1970s, and restored it in 1984. In the years since then, the LDS Church acquired more historic buildings and property in the area. In April 2000, plans were announced to restore the remaining buildings, while reconstructing others, and building a new visitors center. Following the completion of the project, LDS Church president Gordon B. Hinckley dedicated the site on May 18, 2003.

In 2018, Historic Kirtland Village exhibited nearly 600 nativity displays from around the world as part of an annual Christmas tradition in its 10th year.

List of buildings
 Visitors' Center
 Newel K. Whitney Store (restored)
 Newel K. Whitney Home (restored)
 John Johnson Inn (rebuilt)
 Schoolhouse (rebuilt)
 Sawmill (rebuilt): Some of the original foundation stones were used in the reconstruction of the sawmill.
 Ashery (rebuilt): Located a hundred yards from the Newel K. Whitney Store and historically a major source of revenue.

See also

 Mormon Historic Sites Foundation

References

External links

Historic Kirtland Visitors' Center Official site
 Kirtland Restoration Project - Mormon Historic Sites Foundation

Latter Day Saint movement in Ohio
Museums in Lake County, Ohio
Properties of the Church of Jesus Christ of Latter-day Saints
Significant places in Mormonism
Religious museums in Ohio
Open-air museums in Ohio
Kirtland, Ohio
Mormon museums in the United States